Răzvan Sergiu Sava (born 21 June 2002) is a Romanian professional footballer who plays as a goalkeeper for Liga I club CFR Cluj.

Club career 

He made his Liga I debut for CFR Cluj on 14 August 2022, in a 0–1 loss to Botoșani.

References

External links
 
 

2002 births
Living people
Sportspeople from Timișoara
Romanian footballers
Association football goalkeepers
Liga I players
Serie A players
Torino F.C. players
CFR Cluj players
Romania youth international footballers
Romanian expatriate footballers
Expatriate footballers in Italy
Romanian expatriate sportspeople in Italy